This is a list of TNT Tropang Giga seasons of the Philippine Basketball Association.

Three-conference era

Two-conference era
*one-game playoffs

Three-conference era
*one-game playoffs**team had the twice-to-beat advantage

Per season records

Cumulative records